The Best American Short Stories 2007, a volume in The Best American Short Stories series, was edited by Heidi Pitlor and by guest editor Stephen King.

Short Stories included

Other notable stories

Stephen King also selected "100 Other Distinguished Stories of 2006."  These included short stories by many well-known writers including Francine Prose's "An Open Letter to Doctor X" from Virginia Quarterly Review, Jhumpa Lahiri's "Once in a Lifetime" from The New Yorker, Lorrie Moore's "Paper Losses" from The New Yorker and Jacob Appel's "The Butcher's Music" from West Branch, as well as works by up-and-coming fiction writers such as David Kear, Matthew Pitt, Paula Nangle, Alison Clement and Justin Kramon.

Notes

External links
 Best American Short Stories

2007 anthologies
Fiction anthologies
Short Stories 2007
Houghton Mifflin books